Manuel E. Amador Terreros is a corregimiento in Las Palmas District, Veraguas Province, Panama.

References

Corregimientos of Veraguas Province